Yonekura (written: 米倉) is a Japanese surname. Notable people with the surname include:

, Japanese singer-songwriter
, Japanese businessman
, Japanese boxer
, Japanese badminton player
, Japanese boxer
, Japanese footballer
, Japanese footballer
, Japanese daimyō
, Japanese actor
, Japanese daimyō
, Japanese daimyō
, Japanese daimyō 
, Japanese daimyō
, Japanese daimyō
, Japanese daimyō
, Japanese daimyō
, Japanese actress and model
, Japanese pole vaulter
, Japanese singer-songwriter
, Japanese badminton player

See also
Yonekura clan, a Japanese clan

Japanese-language surnames